Doraji taryeong is a Korean folk song which originated from Eunyul in Hwanghae Province. However, the currently sung version is classified as a Gyeonggi minyo (Gyeonggi Province folk song), as the rhythm and the melody have changed to acquire the characteristics of it.

The song is sung with semachi (fast  or ) jangdan (rhythmic structure), with occasional switch to jungmori jangdan. Like other traditional songs from Korea, it uses the pentatonic scale of jung (G), im (A), mu (C), hwang (D), and tae (E).

 is the Korean name for the plant Platycodon grandiflorus (known as "balloon flower" in English) as well as its root.

 is one of the most popular folk songs in both North and South Korea, and in China among the ethnic Koreans. It is also a well known song in Japan, by the name .

Lyrics 

Hangul

Refrain:

Refrain

Refrain

Revised Romanization

Refrain:

Refrain

Refrain

English translation
!
In the depths of the mountains is white !
Though one or two roots only I pull,
my bamboo basket grows full.

Refrain:
!
, good!
There at the foot of the mountains,  is moving to and fro

!
Eunyul Geumsanpo's white !
A root, two roots that I picked up,
in the mountain valley having bumper  crop

Refrain

!
Gangwondo Geumgangsan's white !
Damsels pulling 
have such an elegant hand pose.

Refrain

References 

Korean traditional music
Korean-language songs